The Textile Building is a historic industrial building in downtown Cincinnati, Ohio. The building was constructed in 1906 in a progressive attempt by the city to centralize its scattered garment and textile industries into singular buildings. Designed in the Commercial and Renaissance Revival styles by Cincinnati native and M.I.T. School of Architecture graduate Gustav W. Drach, the 12-story building is currently used for offices and storage. The building was purchased in 2016, and the new owners hope to preserve the building and continue operating it lease-able office space.

History 
Throughout the 1800s, Cincinnati's bustling textiles industry was dispersed throughout the Third Street core of the city. At the turn of the century, Cincinnati began attempting to centralize industries into singular buildings. Thus the necessity came to build a tower dedicated to the manufacturing of garments and other textiles. Construction of this building, appropriately named the Textile Building, began in 1904. Local architect Gustav W. Drach was tapped to design the structure, and he incorporated aspects of both the Chicago school of architecture and the renaissance revival style into his plans. At the time, Drach was considered to be one of Cincinnati's most versatile architects, designing both elegant residences and towering utilitarian structures. In 1976, Textile Building was included as a part of the West Fourth Street Historic District's admission to the National Register of Historic Places (amended August 13, 1979). By the 1980s, the Textile Building was owned by Duke Realty, who undertook an extensive renovation of the building in 1986. The building was sold in the 1990s to a real estate syndicate, and sold again to K-B Opportunity Fund I, which is owned by Koll-Bren of Newport Beach. On March 1, 2016, the Textile Building was purchased for $12 million by the national historic property developer Hudson Holdings. The firm plans to preserve the historic integrity of the building, and continue to operate it as office space.

References

External links

Buildings and structures in Cincinnati
Commercial buildings completed in 1906
1906 establishments in Ohio
Renaissance Revival architecture in Ohio
Chicago school architecture in Ohio